The Dartmouth Higher Ferry, also known as the Dartmouth–Kingswear Floating Bridge, is a vehicular and passenger cable ferry, which crosses the River Dart in the English county of Devon. It is one of three ferries that cross the tidal river from Dartmouth to Kingswear, the others being the Lower Ferry and the Passenger Ferry.

Unlike the Lower Ferry, which operates from slips in the centres of both Dartmouth and Kingswear, the Higher Ferry crosses to the north. In doing so, it allows the A379 road between Kingsbridge and Torbay to bypass the narrow streets in the centre of Kingswear and Dartmouth.

The eastern ferry slip of the Higher Ferry is immediately adjacent to the Britannia Crossing, a level crossing across the Paignton and Dartmouth Steam Railway. All vehicles entering or leaving the ferry must cross this crossing.

The ferry is owned and operated by the Dartmouth–Kingswear Floating Bridge Company, and a toll is charged. The previous ferry boat, named No. 7, was built in 1960 and could carry up to 18 cars. Unusually, although it used cables for guidance, it was actually propelled by paddle wheels, a characteristic it shared with the Bac du Sauvage in France.

Early in 2008, the Dartmouth–Kingswear Floating Bridge Company signed a contract for the construction of a replacement ferry. This ferry, which can carry up to 36 cars, came into service in late June 2009. Unlike the previous ferry, the new ferry is a more conventional cable ferry, using the cables for propulsion as well as guidance. However, it is also provided with four thrusters, one positioned at each corner, in order to provide additional manoeuvrability when operating in strong winds and tidal conditions.

History
The Floating Bridge was authorised by Act of Parliament in 1830.  Because it was making a loss it was suspended in 1855 but reinstated the following year with a new ferry.  It was steam powered from 1831 to 1835 but then worked by hand or horses until 1867 when a steam engine again powered the ferry. It was closed again in 1874 and reopened in 1876 with a new ferry.

On 13 February 2005 the weather and other conditions caused the guide cables on No.7 to come loose, and the ferry, loaded with 15 cars and 34 passengers, to drift towards the sea. The crew managed to moor it to a buoy before it could collide with other vessels or run aground.

See also
Dartmouth Lower Ferry
Dartmouth Passenger Ferry

References

External links
 
 Dartmouth Higher Ferry website 
 

Water transport in Devon
Ferry transport in England
Chain ferries in the United Kingdom
Dartmouth, Devon
River Dart
Industrial archaeological sites in Devon